Del Colombo is an Italian surname.

Geographical distribution
As of 2014, 92.8% of all known bearers of the surname Del Colombo were residents of Italy (frequency 1:298,218), 3.2% of Canada (1:5,256,858) and 2.3% of the United States (1:72,250,255).

In Italy, the frequency of the surname was higher than national average (1:298,218) in the following regions:
 1. Tuscany (1:22,363)
 2. Umbria (1:61,371)
 3. Abruzzo (1:113,449)

People
 Laurent Del Colombo (born 1959), French judoka

References

Italian-language surnames
Surnames of Italian origin